Lieutenant General George Edwin Brink,  (27 September 1889 – 30 April 1971) was a South African military commander.

Early life

Brink was born at Jagersfontein, Orange Free State, on 27 September 1889 and was educated at Grey College, Bloemfontein.

Military career

In 1913, Brink joined the Union Defence Forces. In the First World War, he served in German East Africa during the first East African Campaign. In 1919, he attended the Imperial Staff College. On his return, Brink was appointed to the staff of the South African Military College, later being appointed Commandant of the College.

In 1933, Brink was appointed the first Officer Commanding of the Special Service Battalion.

In December of that year, Colonel Brink was posted to Cape Town to take command of Western Cape Command, where he served till 31 January 1937. From 1 November 1937 to 1939, he was Director of Army Training at Defence Headquarters. He was promoted to Deputy Chief of the General Staff on 15 June 1938.

From 1940 to 1942, Brink commanded the 1st South African Division during the second East African Campaign. He also commanded the division during the Western Desert Campaign in North Africa.

In 1942, Brink turned over command of the division to Dan Pienaar. After hurting his back and being declared unfit for field duty, Brink then commanded the Inland Area Command in South Africa from 1942 to 1944.

From 1944 to 1948, Brink was in charge of demobilisation. He had already retired from the Permanent Force in 1946 and promoted to lieutenant general in the Reserves.

During his military career, Brink was awarded the Croix de Guerre avec Palmes, Distinguished Service Order, Companion of the Order of the Bath in 1941, and Commander of the Order of the British Empire in 1942. He was also appointed Grand Officer of the Order of Orange-Nassau.

References

|-

|-

|-

1889 births
1971 deaths
White South African people
South African people of Dutch descent
South African military personnel of World War II
Alumni of Grey College, Bloemfontein
Recipients of the Croix de Guerre 1939–1945 (France)
Grand Officers of the Order of Orange-Nassau
South African Commanders of the Order of the British Empire